Pratunam, written as Pratu Nam, is an intersection and neighborhood in Bangkok. It is located in Thanon Phaya Thai sub-district, Ratchathewi district. It is the intersection of Phetchaburi, Ratchadamri and Ratchaprarop roads. The next intersection on Ratchaprarop side is Makkasan.

The term "Pratunam" means "water gate", as at one time there was a water gate within nearby Sa Pathum Palace, which commonly was known as Pratunam Wang Sa Pathum or Pratunam Sa Pathum (ประตูน้ำวังสระปทุม, ประตูน้ำสระปทุม). This water gate was built by King Chulalongkorn (Rama V) in the year 1905 to drain water from the Khlong Saen Saep (Saen Saep canal) to distribute to the people, both for agriculture, and water levelling
for boating and rafting. There are two other water gates in Chachoengsao province which were built in the same period.

Currently, Pratunam is widely known as a prominent shopping district. There are many shopping centers and department stores in the area such as Platinum Fashion Mall, Pratunam Market, CentralWorld, Big C Supercenter (Big C Rajdamri), etc. In addition, it is also one of the most important transportation routes in Bangkok. It is close to two other important intersections viz Ratchaprasong and Pathum Wan, and is also a pier for Khlong Saen Saep boat service.

References

External links
Pratunam from Wikivoyage

Road junctions in Bangkok
Neighbourhoods of Bangkok
Ratchathewi district
Shopping districts and streets in Thailand